The 1978 Texas–Arlington Mavericks football team was an American football team that represented the University of Texas at Arlington in the Southland Conference during the 1978 NCAA Division I-A football season. In their fifth year under head coach Harold Elliott, the team compiled a 5–6 record.

Schedule

References

Texas–Arlington
Texas–Arlington Mavericks football seasons
Texas–Arlington Mavericks football